Winter Haven is a train station in Winter Haven, Florida, served by Amtrak, the national railroad passenger system of the United States. It was originally built in 1925 by the Seaboard Air Line Railway, and was rebuilt in 1947. It included a freight depot which was located on the south side of the station until 1982, and was torn down after Seaboard Coast Line Railroad merged with Louisville and Nashville Railroad the next year. Abandoned tracks cross the platform on the south side of the station.

The station provides service 4 times daily on the northbound and southbound Silver Star and Silver Meteor lines.

References

External links

Winter Haven Amtrak Station (USA Rail Guide -- Train Web)

Amtrak stations in Florida
Transportation buildings and structures in Polk County, Florida
Seaboard Air Line Railroad stations
Railway stations in the United States opened in 1925
Buildings and structures in Winter Haven, Florida
1925 establishments in Florida